was a rear admiral in the Imperial Japanese Navy during the Pacific War of World War II. He committed suicide after facing imminent defeat during the Battle of Manila. Units under his command committed the Manila massacre.

Life and career
Iwabuchi was a native of what is now part of the city of Sanjō, Niigata Prefecture. He graduated from the 43rd class of the Imperial Japanese Naval Academy in December 1915 ranked 13th out of 96 cadets, and on graduation continued on to naval artillery school to become a specialist in that field. He served as a midshipman on the cruiser , which made a long-distance navigational training voyage to Hong Kong, Singapore, Australia, New Zealand and the South Seas Mandate in 1915. As an ensign in 1918, he was assigned to the cruiser  and as a first lieutenant he was assigned to the destroyer Umikaze in 1919. In 1920, after completion of Torpedo Warfare School, he was assigned to the Yokosuka Air Group until the end of 1922.

In 1934–1935, he was assigned to Kure Naval District and was in charge of coastal artillery.

Iwabuchi was promoted to captain in November 1937, and was given command of the seaplane tender  in 1938. In April 1941 he was assigned command of the training vessel .

World War II
At the time of the attack on Pearl Harbor in 1941, Iwabuchi was captain of the seaplane tender . He was reassigned to the staff of the Combined Fleet on 25 March 1942, and was subsequently given command of the battleship  on 20 April 1942. He commanded Kirishima in the Battle of Midway in June 1942, but Kirishima was sunk in the Second Naval Battle of Guadalcanal on 15 November of the same year. A week later, on 22 November, Iwabuchi was reassigned to command the 11th Air Fleet in charge of air operations over Guadalcanal and Rabaul.

Iwabuchi returned to the Yokosuka Naval District on 10 February 1943, and was promoted to rear admiral on 1 May. On 5 May, he was assigned to the Personnel and Recruiting Department at Maizuru Naval District. This would normally have been a dead-end position to his career; however, the increasingly desperate war situation provided Iwabuchi with a final opportunity. On 1 November 1944, he was given command of the 3rd Southern Escort Fleet and on 17 November, its accompanying ground force, the 31st Naval Base Force, and ordered to the Philippines, which were then under impending threat of Allied invasion. Iwabuchi was assigned command of the defenses of the city of Manila.

Once American forces had landed on Luzon and had begun converging on Manila, welcomed and assisted by Filipino troops of the Philippine Commonwealth Army and Philippine Constabulary, the Japanese supreme commander for operations in the Philippines, Lt.-General Tomoyuki Yamashita gave Iwabuchi a direct order to withdraw from Manila without combat. Yamashita wanted to consolidate his forces, and to avoid being trapped in urban warfare in downtown Manila with close to a million civilians. However, Iwabuchi repeatedly refused to obey orders. Citing shame at having lost , Iwabuchi stated that he could redeem himself only by holding his position to the death.

Together with the under-equipped and ill-disciplined 15,000 marines and 4,000 Imperial Japanese Army stragglers under his command, he found several good defensive positions in the historic Intramuros area of the old city of Manila, including the massive walls of colonial Fort Santiago. During the Allied artillery bombardment of Iwabuchi's positions, thousands of civilians were killed. Thousands more were killed in the crossfire, and thousands were killed by Japanese forces in reprisal for the Allied attacks in what came to be called the "Manila Massacre". After many days of building-to-building combat, more than 16,000 Japanese defenders were killed, and by 26 February Iwabuchi committed suicide at his command post, using a pistol pointed to his mouth, although his body was never positively identified. He was posthumously promoted to vice admiral.

Portrayal
Eddie Garcia portrayed Admiral Iwabuchi in the 1968 film Manila, Open City.

References

Fuller, Richard. 1992. Shokan: Hirohito's Samurai. London: Arms and Armor.

External links
 Pacific Pacific War Online
Nishida: Materials of the Imperial Japanese Navy

1893 births
1945 suicides
Japanese mass murderers
Military personnel from Niigata Prefecture
Imperial Japanese Navy admirals
Battle of Midway
Japanese military personnel killed in World War II
Japanese admirals of World War II
Japanese military personnel who committed suicide
Suicides by firearm in the Philippines
War criminals